Sascha Juul Pedersen (born 27 February 1990) is a Danish handball player who has played for Ringkøbing Håndbold since 2020.

References

External links
 DHDb - Sascha Juul 
 Handball - Sascha Juul 
 NFH beholder Sascha Juul 
 Player profile - Sascha Juul

1998 births
Living people
Handball players from Copenhagen
Danish female handball players